Zoltán Kodály (16 December 1882 – 6 March 1967) was a Hungarian composer, ethnomusicologist, music pedagogue, linguist, and philosopher. He is well known internationally as the creator of the Kodály method of music education.

Life
Born in Kecskemét, Hungary, Kodály learned to play the violin as a child. In 1900, he entered the Department of Languages at the University of Budapest and at the same time Hans von Kössler's composition class at the Royal Hungarian Academy of Music. After completing his studies, he studied in Paris with Charles Widor for a year.

In 1905 he visited remote villages to collect songs, recording them on phonograph cylinders. In 1906 he wrote a thesis on Hungarian folk song, "Strophic Construction in Hungarian Folksong". At around this time Kodály met fellow composer and compatriot Béla Bartók, whom he took under his wing and introduced to some of the methods involved in folk song collecting. The two became lifelong friends and champions of each other's music.

All these works show great originality of form and content, a very interesting blend of highly sophisticated mastery of the western European style of music, including classical, late-romantic, impressionistic and modernist traditions, and on the other hand a profound knowledge and respect for the folk music of Hungary (including the Hungarian-inhabited areas of modern-day Slovakia and Romania, as those territories were part of Hungary). Partly because of the Great War and subsequent major geopolitical changes in the region, and partly because of a naturally rather diffident temperament in youth, Kodály had no major public success until 1923. This was the year when one of his best-known pieces, Psalmus Hungaricus, was given its first performance at a concert to celebrate the fiftieth anniversary of the union of Buda and Pest (Bartók's Dance Suite premiered on the same occasion.)

Kodály's first wife was Emma Gruber (née Schlesinger, later Sándor), the dedicatee of Ernő Dohnányi's Waltz for piano with four hands, Op. 3, and Variations and Fugue on a theme by E.G., Op. 4 (1897).
In November 1958, after 48 years of marriage, Kodály's first wife Emma died. In December 1959, Kodály married , his 19-year-old student at the Franz Liszt Academy of Music with whom he lived happily until his death in 1967 at the age of 84 in Budapest.

In 1966, Kodály toured the United States and gave a special lecture at Stanford University, where some of his music was performed in his presence.

Kodály methodology of musical education

Throughout his adult life, Kodály was very interested in the problems of many types of music education, and he wrote a large amount of material on teaching methods as well as composing plenty of music intended for children's use. Beginning in 1935, along with his colleague Jenő Ádám (14 years his junior), he embarked on a long-term project to reform music teaching in Hungary's lower and middle schools. His work resulted in the publication of several highly influential books.

The goals of the Kodály method can summarized into the following points: 

 Music is for everyone. 
 Music teaching should be sequential and begin with the child in mind. 
 Kids should be taught music from an early age. 
 The sequence should be logical and follow the same process children learn language. 
 Music classes should be enjoyable engaging. 
 Singing is the first and most valuable tool for learning musical concepts. 
 Teachers should pull from quality folk song materials in the "mother tongue" of the students. 

The Hungarian music education program that developed in the 1940s became the basis for the Kodály Method. Although Kodály himself did not write down a comprehensive method, he did establish a set of principles to follow in music education, and these principles were widely taken up by pedagogues (above all in Hungary, but also in many other countries) after World War II. His practices also have evolved Kodály hand signs.

In the motion picture Close Encounters of the Third Kind, a visual learning aid distributed to members of a conference of ufologists was named the Kodály Method and referenced musical notes as hand signals.

Legacy and memorials

The city of  Pécs commissioned a full-length bronze statue, located in Szent István square, in his honour in 1976. According to the wishes of the sculptor, the work stands with its back to the Cathedral and facing a former playground, so that it was facing children, whose musical education was the most important thing in Kodály's life. He is depicted as a fragile old man, who walks almost imperceptibly among the horse-chestnut trees.

At one point during the Hungarian Revolution of 1956, the Workers Councils proposed to form a government with Kodály as president "because of his great national and international reputation."

Selected works

Stage works
 Háry János, Op. 15 (1926)
 Székelyfonó (The Spinning Room) (1924–1932)

Orchestral
 Idyll Summer Evening (1906, revised 1929)
 Háry János Suite (1926)
 Dances of Marosszék (1929; orchestration of the 1927 piano set)
 Theatre Overture (1931) (originally intended for Háry János)
 Dances of Galánta (1933)
 Variations on a Hungarian folk song (Fölszállott a páva, or The Peacock Roared, 1939)
 Concerto for Orchestra (1940)
 Symphony in memoriam Toscanini (1961)

Chamber or instrumental
 Adagio for Violin (or Viola or Cello) and Piano (1905)
 Intermezzo for String Trio (1905)
 Seven Pieces for Piano, Op. 11 (1918)
 String Quartet No. 1 in C minor, Op. 2 (1909)
 Cello Sonata, Op. 4 (1910)
 Duo for Violin and Cello, Op. 7 (1914)
 Sonata for Solo Cello, Op. 8 (1915)
 String Quartet No. 2, Op. 10 (1916–1918)
 Szerenád (Serenade) for 2 Violins and Viola, Op. 12 (1920)
 Marosszéki táncok (Dances of Marosszék, piano, 1927)
 Organ Prelude Pange lingua (1931)
 Organoeida ad missam lectam (Csendes mise, organ, 1944)
 Epigrammak (1954)

Choral
 Este (Evening) (1904)
 Psalmus Hungaricus, Op. 13 (1923)
 Mátrai képek (Mátra Pictures) for choir a cappella (1931)
 Jézus és a kufárok (Jesus and the Traders) for choir a cap (1934)
 Ének Szent István királyhoz (Hymn to St Stephen) (1938)
 Te Deum for Buda Castle (1936)
 Te Deum of Sándor Sík for choir a cappella (1961)
 Missa brevis for choir and Organ (1942, orchestrated 1948)
 Laudes organi for choir and Organ (1966)
 Adventi ének (Veni, veni, Emmanuel) for choir a cappella

Organ
 Introitus - Kyrie
 Gloria
 Credo
 Sanctus
 Benedictus
 Agnus Dei
 Ite missa est
 114. Genfi zsoltár
 Pangue lingua
 Laudes Organi

See also
 Solfège, a music education method used to teach pitch and sight singing

References

Further reading

 Breuer, János (1990) A Guide to Kodály. Budapest: Corvina Books
 Eösze, László, Micheál Houlahan, and Philip Tacka), "Zoltán Kodály (1882–1967)". The New Grove Dictionary of Music and Musicians Volume 13. Ed. Stanley Sadie. London: Macmillan Publishers, 2002. pp. 716–26
 Houlahan, M & Philip Tacka Kodály Today: A Cognitive Approach to Elementary Music Education. (New York: Oxford University Press, 2008, 2015), 644p.
 Houlahan, M & Philip Tacka Kodály in the Kindergarten: Developing the Creative Brain in the Twenty-First Century. (New York: Oxford University Press, 2015). 576p.
 Houlahan, M & Philip Tacka Kodály in the First Grade Classroom: Developing the Creative Brain in the Twenty-First Century. (New York: Oxford University Press, 2015). 264p.
 Houlahan, M & Philip Tacka Kodály in the Second Grade Classroom: Developing the Creative Brain in the Twenty-First Century. (New York: Oxford University Press, 2015). 296p.
 Houlahan, M & Philip Tacka Kodály in the Third Grade Classroom: Developing the Creative Brain in the Twenty-First Century. (New York: Oxford University Press, 2015). 328p.
 Houlahan, M & Philip Tacka Kodály in the Fourth Grade Classroom: Developing the Creative Brain in the Twenty-First Century. (New York: Oxford University Press, 2015). 344p.
 Houlahan, M & Philip Tacka Kodály in the Fifth Grade Classroom: Developing the Creative Brain in the Twenty-First Century. (New York: Oxford University Press, 2015). 376p.
 Houlahan, M & Philip Tacka From Sound to Symbol: Fundamentals of Music. Second edition including an audio CD and interactive Skill Development DVD and web-based supplementary materials for eleven chapters. (New York: Oxford University Press, 2009, 2011), 489p.
 Folk Music of Hungary, New York: Praeger, 1971
 Lendvai, Ernő (1983) The Workshop of Bartók and Kodály. Budapest: Editio Musica Budapest

External links

 The American Folk Song Collection – The Kodály Center at Holy Names University
 The Kodály Institute, which educates musicians according to Kodály's practice
 International Kodály Society
 The Organization of American Kodály Educators
 The Kodály Music Education Institute of Australia
 The British Kodály Academy (Registered Charity)
 

1882 births
1967 deaths
20th-century classical composers
20th-century conductors (music)
20th-century linguists
20th-century Hungarian male musicians
20th-century musicologists
Articles containing video clips
Béla Bartók
Burials at Farkasréti Cemetery
Catholic liturgical composers
Classical composers of church music
Franz Liszt Academy of Music alumni
Academic staff of the Franz Liszt Academy of Music
Herder Prize recipients
Hungarian classical composers
Hungarian classical musicians
Hungarian conductors (music)
Hungarian ethnomusicologists
Hungarian folk-song collectors
Hungarian male classical composers
Hungarian music educators
Hungarian opera composers
Linguists from Hungary
Male conductors (music)
Male opera composers
Members of the Hungarian Academy of Sciences
Members of the National Assembly of Hungary (1945–1947)
People from Kecskemét
Pupils of Hans von Koessler
Royal Philharmonic Society Gold Medallists